The Langston Hughes Medal has been awarded annually by the Langston Hughes Festival of the City College of New York since 1978. The medal "is awarded to highly distinguished writers from throughout the African American diaspora for their impressive works of poetry, fiction, drama, autobiography and critical essays that help to celebrate the memory and tradition of Langston Hughes. Each year, the LHF’s Advisory Committee reviews the work of major black writers from Africa to America whose work is accessed as likely having a lasting impact on world literature.".

Recipients
Recipients of the Langston Hughes medallion are:

 Chinua Achebe (1993)
 Hilton Als (2018)
 Maya Angelou (1991)
 James Baldwin (1978)
 Toni Cade Bambara (1981)
 Amiri Baraka (1989)
 Gwendolyn Brooks (1979)
 Sterling A. Brown (1982)
 Dennis Brutus (1987)
 Octavia Butler (2005)
 Alice Childress (1990)
 Lucille Clifton (2003)
 Jayne Cortez (2001)
 Edwidge Danticat (2011)
 Rita Dove (2019)
 Michael Eric Dyson (2020)
 Ralph W. Ellison (1984)
 James A. Emanuel (2003)
 Ernest Gaines (1994)
 Nikki Giovanni (1996)
 John Oliver Killens (1980)
 Jamaica Kincaid (2021)
 George Lamming (1998)
 Paule Marshall (1981)
 Toni Morrison (1981)
 Walter Mosley (2014)
 Albert Murray (1997)
 Raymond R. Patterson (1986)
 Arnold Rampersad (2003)
 Ishmael Reed (1995)
 Sonia Sanchez (1999)
 Ntozake Shange (2016)
 Zadie Smith (2017)
 Wole Soyinka (2000)
 Sekou Sundiata (2003)
 Derek Walcott (2002)
Alice Walker (1988)
 Margaret Walker Alexander (1983)
 John Edgar Wideman (2004)
 Gregory H. Williams (2008)
 August Wilson (1992)
 Jacqueline Woodson (2015)

References

External links
 The Langston Hughes Festival Award
 List of Medallion Recipients

American literary awards
Awards honoring African Americans
Awards established in 1973
Literary awards honoring minority groups
African diaspora
African-American literature